KIBC (90.5 FM) is a radio station broadcasting a religious radio format. Licensed to Burney in Northeastern California, serving the surrounding Sierra Nevada area.  It is in Shasta County, California.

The station is currently owned by Burney Educational Broadcasting Foundation.

External links

IBC
Shasta County, California